Piz S-chalembert is a mountain in the Sesvenna Range of the Alps, overlooking Ramosch in the canton of Graubünden. With a height of 3,031 metres above sea level, it is the highest summit of the group east of the Schlinigpass.

References

External links
 Piz S-chalembert on Hikr

Mountains of Graubünden
Mountains of the Alps
Alpine three-thousanders
Mountains of Switzerland
Valsot